Saguier is a French surname. Notable people with the surname include:

 Adolfo Saguier (1832-1902), Paraguayan politician
 Emiliano Saguier, Paraguayan chess master
 Jara Saguier - football (soccer) players from Paraguay
 Rubén Bareiro Saguier (1930-2014), Paraguayan writer

Spanish-language surnames